Hangu railway station is an abandoned railway station located in Hangu District, Pakistan.

See also
 List of railway stations in Pakistan
 Pakistan Railways

References

External links

Railway stations in Hangu District, Pakistan